Lynette Ann Larsen  (born 3 February 1963) is an Australian former cricketer who played as an all-rounder, batting right-handed and bowling right-arm leg break. She appeared in 15 Test matches and 49 One Day Internationals for Australia between 1984 and 1994, and captained the side between 1986 and 1993. She played domestic cricket for New South Wales and Australian Capital Territory.

She captained Australia in ten Test matches, including 5 victories. The number of Test matches in which she was captain, number of matches won, and percentage of victories, are all records for Australia. She also captained the side in 39 One Day Internationals, winning 27 and losing 10, including winning the World Cup in 1988.

In all, Larsen played in 15 Test matches, scoring 410 runs at a batting average of 41.00 with a high score of 86. She also bowled 354 overs of leg spin, taking 26 wickets at a bowling average of 18.73 and giving away under 1.5 runs per over.

Larsen was inducted into the Sport Australia Hall of Fame in 1999. She was inducted into the New South Wales Cricket Hall of Fame in 2010, along with Stan McCabe and Mark Waugh. In 2013 Larsen became the first female cricketer to be appointed to the Sydney Cricket Ground Trust.

References

External links
 
 
 Lyn Larsen at southernstars.org.au

1963 births
Living people
People from Lismore, New South Wales
Cricketers from New South Wales
Australia women Test cricketers
Australia women One Day International cricketers
Australia Test cricket captains
New South Wales Breakers cricketers
ACT Meteors cricketers
Sport Australia Hall of Fame inductees
Members of the Order of Australia